Pankaj Oswal is an Indian businessman. He was the chairman and sole founder of Burrup Holdings Limited, a Perth, Australia based company and one of the world's largest liquid ammonia production companies. Oswal has an estimated fortune of over A$3 billion.

Personal life
Pankaj is the son of Abhay Kumar Oswal, founder of Oswal Agro Mills and Oswal Greentech which are currently managed by his brother Shael Oswal. He grew up in India and studied at Manipal Institute of Technology. After graduating, he worked in several of his father's enterprises. He is married to Radhika Oswal; the couple has two daughters.

Controversy 
Pankaj and his wife were accused of embezzling upwards of $150 million from Burrup Holdings to fund a lifestyle of private jets, yachts, luxury cars, and building a 'Taj Mahal' on the Swan River in Perth. All lawsuits came to an end for the Oswals in 2016.

In August 2016, Pankaj and Radhika Oswal settled their high-profile lawsuit against ANZ Bank over their Burrup Fertiliser business.

The Oswals had accused ANZ staff of acting in a bigoted manner towards them, emphasising their background as Indian nationals. They had also claimed ANZ's former chief risk officer Chris Page had used physical force by putting Mr. Oswal in a headlock to force them to sign a guarantee over their shares that led to the forced sale of their stake. ANZ chief legal counsel was also accused of telling Mrs. Oswal she and her husband would go to jail and their children would be orphans if they did not sign the guarantee.

ANZ paid an undisclosed amount to Mr. and Mrs. Oswal for taking over Burrup Fertiliser Business without giving due consideration clearing their names from all allegations received.

References

External links
Pankaj Oswal Official Blog

Living people
Australian businesspeople
Rajasthani people
Businesspeople of Indian descent
Manipal Academy of Higher Education alumni
Year of birth missing (living people)